William John Loucks (26 June 1873 – 2 September 1968) was a Conservative member of the House of Commons of Canada. He was born in Battersea, Ontario and became a farmer.

Loucks attended schools at Battersea and Kingston. For 15 years, he served as president of the Delisle Telephone Company.

He was elected to Parliament at the Rosetown riding in the 1930 general election. After serving a term in the 17th Canadian Parliament, Loucks was defeated by Major James Coldwell of the Co-operative Commonwealth Federation in the 1935 federal election, after riding boundaries were changed to replace the Rosetown riding with the new Rosetown—Biggar electoral district.

References

External links
 

1873 births
1968 deaths
Members of the House of Commons of Canada from Saskatchewan
Conservative Party of Canada (1867–1942) MPs
Farmers from Saskatchewan